In biology, the canopy is the aboveground portion of a plant cropping or crop, formed by the collection of individual plant crowns. In forest ecology, canopy refers to the upper layer or habitat zone, formed by mature tree crowns and including other biological organisms (epiphytes, lianas, arboreal animals, etc.). The communities that inhabit the canopy layer are thought to be involved in maintaining forest diversity, resilience, and functioning. Shade trees normally have a dense canopy that blocks light from lower growing plants.

Observation 
Early observations of canopies were made from the ground using binoculars or by examining fallen material. Researchers would sometimes erroneously rely on extrapolation by using more reachable samples taken from the understory. In some cases, they would use unconventional methods such as chairs suspended on vines or hot-air dirigibles, among others. Modern technology, including adapted mountaineering gear, has made canopy observation significantly easier and more accurate, allowed for longer and more collaborative work, and broadened the scope of canopy study.

Structure 

Canopy structure is the organization or spatial arrangement (three-dimensional geometry) of a plant canopy. Leaf area index, leaf area per unit ground area, is a key measure used to understand and compare plant canopies. The canopy is taller than the understory layer. The canopy holds 90% of the animals in the rainforest. Canopies can cover vast distances and appear to be unbroken when observed from an airplane. However, despite overlapping tree branches, rainforest canopy trees rarely touch each other. Rather, they are usually separated by a few feet.

Dominant and co-dominant canopy trees form the uneven canopy layer. Canopy trees are able to photosynthesize relatively rapidly with abundant light, so it supports the majority of primary productivity in forests. The canopy layer provides protection from strong winds and storms while also intercepting sunlight and precipitation, leading to a relatively sparsely vegetated understory layer.

Forest canopies are home to unique flora and fauna not found in other layers of forests. The highest terrestrial biodiversity resides in the canopies of tropical rainforests. Many rainforest animals have evolved to live solely in the canopy and never touch the ground. The canopy of a rainforest is typically about 10 m thick, and intercepts around 95% of sunlight. The canopy is below the emergent layer, a sparse layer of very tall trees, typically one or two per hectare. With an abundance of water and a near ideal temperature in rainforests, light and nutrients are two factors that limit tree growth from the understory to the canopy.

In the permaculture and forest gardening community, the canopy is the highest of seven layers.

Ecology 
Forest canopies have unique structural and ecological complexities and are important components of the overall forest ecosystem. They are involved in critical functions such as rainfall interception, light absorption, nutrient & energy cycling, gas exchange, as well as providing habitats for a diverse range of wildlife. The canopy also plays a role in modifying the internal environment of the forest by acting as a buffer for incoming light, wind, and temperature fluctuations.

The forest canopy layer supports a diverse range of flora and fauna. It has been dubbed “the last biotic frontier” as it provides a habitat that has allowed for the evolution of countless species of plants, microorganisms, invertebrates (e.g. insects), and vertebrates (e.g. birds and mammals) that are unique to the upper layer of forests. Forest canopies are arguably considered some of the most species-rich environments on the planet. It is believed that the communities found within the canopy layer play an important role in the functioning of the forest, as well as maintaining diversity and ecological resilience.

Climate regulation 
Forest canopies contribute to forest microclimate by controlling and buffering variations in climatic conditions. Forest canopies intercept rain and snowfall, thereby buffering the effects of precipitation on the local climate. Forest canopies also buffer the effects of temperature within forests by creating vertical light gradients. Variations in forest microclimate are also driven by the structure and physiology of canopy trees and epiphytes. This produces feedback loops where forest microclimate both determines and is determined by the species identity, growth traits and forest stand composition of canopy trees.

Forest canopies are significantly involved in maintaining the stability of the global climate. They are responsible for at least half of the global carbon dioxide exchange between terrestrial ecosystems and the atmosphere. Forest canopies act as carbon sinks which reduce the increase of atmospheric CO2 caused by human activity. The destruction of forest canopies would lead to the release of carbon dioxide which would result in an increased concentration of atmospheric CO2. This would then contribute to the greenhouse effect, thereby causing the planet to become warmer.

Canopy interception

See also

References

Further reading

External links

International Canopy Access Network

Biology terminology
Forest ecology
Habitat
Rainforests